Steven Ralph Schirripa (born September 3, 1957) is an American actor. He is best known for portraying Bobby Baccalieri on The Sopranos, Leo Boykewich on The Secret Life of the American Teenager, and Detective Anthony Abetemarco on Blue Bloods. Schirripa is host of two Investigation Discovery series: Karma's A B*tch! and Nothing Personal. He is the voice of Roberto in the Open Season film series.

Early life 
Schirripa was born on September 3, 1957 in Bensonhurst, Brooklyn. His father, Ralph Schirripa, was Italian-American. His grandparents, Ilario Schirripa and Maria Capacci, were from Riace, Calabria, Southern Italy. His mother, Lorraine Schirripa (née Bernstein), was of Jewish descent. Schirripa grew up in a low-income household with four siblings, went to Lafayette High School and graduated from Brooklyn College.

Career

Film and television 
Schirripa got his first taste of show business in his job as entertainment director of the Riviera Hotel and Casino in Las Vegas. In the biography page of his website, Schirripa says that he had cameo appearances in comedy specials by Drew Carey and Kevin Pollak, among other comedians. That led to a role as an uncredited extra in Martin Scorsese's Casino. In the film, he portrayed a customer at the bar in the scene when Joe Pesci's character angrily stabs a man with a pen. After this, Schirripa decided that he wanted to become an actor.

He had several minor roles in films, including The Runner (1999) and Joe Dirt (2001). His breakthrough role was in the second season (2000) of The Sopranos, playing Tony Soprano's mobster brother-in-law Bobby Baccalieri. By chance, he was in New York City in June 1999 for a friend's wedding, and around that time he was invited for an audition in New York City, initially for Agent Skip Lipari, and later for the role of Baccalieri. He played Baccalieri for five seasons, and for the first two seasons he wore a fat suit to fit the role.

His many television appearances include Angel, Casino Cinema, Columbo, Star Trek: Enterprise, Hollywood Squares, Joey, Law & Order, Law & Order: Special Victims Unit, My Wife and Kids, Ed, Jeopardy!, George Lopez, Tim and Eric Awesome Show, Great Job! and The King of Queens. In 2008, Schirripa appeared on CBS's primetime game show Million Dollar Password, and in 2019, Schirripa appeared on the game show Pyramid alongside Jamie-Lynn Sigler. He also made an uncredited appearance along with fellow Soprano star Vincent Pastore on the 6th Season episode of Aqua Teen Hunger Force entitled "She Creature".

Schirripa was a frequent guest on the Don Imus radio program. In February 2007, he began to make appearances for Total Nonstop Action Wrestling, on Spike TV, siding with Team 3D as their cousin in their ongoing battle against The Latin American Xchange. On October 30, 2007, he appeared on, The Podge and Rodge Show. He also did spots as "Steve the Judgmental Bastard" on The Tonight Show with Jay Leno, and taped several episodes of The Gong Show with Dave Attell, as one of the celebrity judges.

From 2008 to 2012, Schirripa had a recurring role in the ABC Family show, The Secret Life of the American Teenager, as Leo Boykewich, Ben's dad.

In 2009, he made a cameo appearance alongside fellow Sopranos actor Frank Vincent in Stargate Atlantis episode "Vegas". He was also in 2009's My Fake Fiancé with Melissa Joan Hart and Joey Lawrence as the Monkey.

He has appeared on the Tonight Show more than 40 times as a guest and as a correspondent. Schirripa hosted NBC's poker game show, Face the Ace, with the premiere episode airing on August 1, 2009. In the fall of 2010, Schirripa had a guest star role in the digital comedy short film, Lil DPC, from writer/director Michael Ratner, which also features rapper Fat Joe and Blink 182's Mark Hoppus.

In 2011 and 2012, Schirripa hosted and narrated the television true-crime series Nothing Personal, which premiered in the US on Investigation Discovery and in the UK on History. The series featured an often humorous take on true stories and reenactments of murders-for-hire. In addition to hosting the hour-long programs, Schirripa was one of the program's executive producers. Subsequently, Schirripa hosted Karma's a B*tch!, also for Investigation Discovery.

He has also guest-starred in the American version of Top Gear. Schirripa played Sonny Rosselli in A Poet Long Ago, a short film written by Pete Hamill and directed by Bob Giraldi, which gained entry into a number of film festivals in 2013.

In 2014, Schirripa played Joey on the ABC series Black Box, did voice acting in an episode of American Dad! entitled "Stan Goes on the Pill", and played Vito in the silver screen adaptation Jersey Boys, directed by Clint Eastwood. He will play Father Ed in Chasing Yesterday, a film by writer/director Joseph Pernice, as well as be in the film Houses, by writer/director Jenner Furst, alongside Sopranos co-stars Michael Imperioli and John Ventimiglia.

Starting in 2015, Schirripa has played Det. Anthony Abetemarco, an investigator who works with assistant district attorney Erin Reagan on the CBS series Blue Bloods.

In July 2017, Schirripa appeared in a segment on John Oliver's satirical news show Last Week Tonight satirizing Boris Epshteyn and the right-wing tone of mandatory segments given to member stations by the Sinclair Broadcast Group.

Schirripa co-hosts a podcast with Michael Imperioli called Talking Sopranos, which began on April 6, 2020. The two provide inside info as they follow The Sopranos series episode by episode. By September 2020, the podcast had reached over five million downloads. On September 17, 2020, Imperioli and Schirripa signed a deal with HarperCollins book imprint William Morrow and Company to write an oral history of the show; the book titled Woke Up This Morning: The Definitive Oral History of The Sopranos was released on November 2, 2021.

Books 
Schirripa's acting roles often portrayed "goombas," slang for stereotypical Italian-American tough guys and often denoting connections to the Mafia. He carried that persona over into real life but with a comedic twist, especially in appearances on talk and game shows. He expanded on that persona when he wrote a series of books starting with A Goomba's Guide to Life in 2002. He followed up with The Goomba's Book of Love, co-authored with Charles Fleming in 2003. The series continued with The Goomba Diet: Large and Loving It in 2006, and in 2013 Big Daddy's Rules: Raising Daughters Is Tougher Than I Look, co-authored by Philip Lerman.

Schirripa and Fleming also collaborated on two books about Nicky Deuce, a suburban teenager who is sent to visit his grandparents in Brooklyn. Nicky Deuce: Welcome to the Family was followed by Nicky Deuce: Home for the Holidays, which was the basis for the 2013 Nickelodeon film Nicky Deuce starring Noah Munck. Nicky Deuce also featured supporting roles filled by James Gandolfini, Michael Imperioli, Tony Sirico, and Vincent Curatola of The Sopranos fame.

Theatre 
On April 3, 2014, Steve Schirripa gave a theatrical performance in a special production of Guys and Dolls alongside Nathan Lane, Patrick Wilson, and Megan Mullally at Carnegie Hall.

Uncle Steve's Italian Specialties 
In 2014, Schirripa launched a line of organic vegan pasta sauces under the business name of Uncle Steve's Italian Specialties Group. Schirripa appeared on the Eric Andre Show, in part, to promote the sauce.

Personal life 
Schirripa married Laura Lemos on April 22, 1989. They have two children, daughters Bria and Ciara.

When asked if he was bar mitzvahed, Schirripa answered no and stated that he was raised as a Catholic but that he "very much identifies as being Jewish as well".

Filmography

Film

Television

References

External links 
 
 

1957 births
Living people
American Ashkenazi Jews
Film producers from New York (state)
Television producers from New York City
American male singers
American animators
American male voice actors
American people of Italian descent
People of Calabrian descent
American male film actors
American male television actors
People from the Las Vegas Valley
Male actors from New York City
20th-century American male actors
21st-century American male actors
Lafayette High School (New York City) alumni
Musicians from Brooklyn
People from Bensonhurst, Brooklyn
Jewish American male actors
American male writers
American podcasters
21st-century American Jews